For main article please see CD Logroñés.

Managers
Logrones